Luz Bulnes Aldunate (died 24 September 2019) was a Chilean lawyer who was a member of the Constitutional Court.

References

Date of birth missing
2019 deaths
20th-century Chilean lawyers
Academic staff of the University of Chile
Chilean women lawyers
20th-century women lawyers